Santpoort Zuid railway station is located in Santpoort-Zuid, the Netherlands. The station opened 1 May 1867 on the Haarlem–Uitgeest railway. The station has 2 platforms.

Train services
As of 9 December 2018, the following services call at Sandpoort Zuid:

National Rail

Bus services

External links
NS website 
Dutch public transport travel planner 

Railway stations in North Holland
Railway stations opened in 1867
Velsen